Epischnia is a genus of moths of the family Pyralidae described by Jacob Hübner in 1825.

Species
Epischnia adultella Zeller, 1848
Epischnia agnieleae Leraut, 2003
Epischnia albella Amsel, 1954
Epischnia aspergella Ragonot, 1887
Epischnia asteris Staudinger, 1870
Epischnia beharella (Viette, 1964)
Epischnia brevipalpella Ragonot, 1893
Epischnia castillella Ragonot, 1894
Epischnia christophori Ragonot, 1887
Epischnia cinerosalis Walker & Rothschild, 1905
Epischnia cretaciella Mann, 1869
Epischnia glyphella Ragonot, 1887
Epischnia hesperidella Rebel, 1917
Epischnia illotella Zeller, 1839
Epischnia leucoloma Herrich-Schäffer, 1849
Epischnia leucomixtella Ragonot, 1887
Epischnia maracandella Ragonot, 1887
Epischnia masticella Ragonot, 1887
Epischnia muscidella Ragonot, 1887
Epischnia nervosella Ragonot, 1887
Epischnia oculatella Ragonot, 1887
Epischnia plumbella Ragonot, 1887
Epischnia prodromella (Hübner, 1799)
Epischnia ragonotella Rothschild, 1915
Epischnia sareptella Leraut, 2002
Epischnia sulcatella Christoph, 1877
Epischnia thewysi Leraut, 2002
Epischnia yangtseella (Caradja, 1939)

References

Phycitini
Pyralidae genera